Kobanê is a Kurdish war film about the Siege of Kobanî fought from October 2014 to January 2015 between the Kurdish People's Defense Units (YPG) and the Women's Protection Units (YPJ) against the Islamic State. The film is directed by Özlem Yasar and produced by the Rojava Film Commune. It was shot in Al-Thawrah and Tebqa in Syria. The film focuses on the role of Kurdish women in the fighting.

The film premiered in the city of Kobanê at the Cultural Centre on 20 September 2022.

Synopsis
The film follows the life of Zohra, a 32 year old YPJ fighter who becomes the commander of her unit when the commander in-charge flees the battle field. She leads the Kurdish forces to break the siege of Kobane and liberate the city in spite of the ISIS having stronger numbers and heavier weapons.

References

External links

2020s war films
2022 films
Films about Islamic State of Iraq and the Levant
Films about revolutions
Guerrilla warfare in film
Kurdish films
Kurdish-language films
People's Protection Units
Siege films
War films based on actual events
Works about the Syrian civil war
Works about women in war